Jacqueline Rigaud (21 June 1925 – 4 December 2022) was a French resistant. The daughter of Paul-Raymond and Marie-Louise Rigaud, she took part in the French Resistance.

Honors
Knight of the Legion of Honour (2007)
Righteous Among the Nations (2017)

References

1925 births
2022 deaths
French Resistance members
Chevaliers of the Légion d'honneur
French Righteous Among the Nations
People from Gaillac